Shotover is a hill and forest in South Oxfordshire. It may also refer to:

Shotover Park, country house and estate in Oxfordshire
Forest Hill with Shotover, civil parish in Oxfordshire
Shotover Country, suburb of Queenstown, New Zealand
Shotover River, river in Otago, New Zealand
Shotover Brewery, brewery in Oxford, England
Shotover (horse) (1879–1898), British thoroughbred racehorse and broodmare
Captain Shotover, character in George Bernard Shaw's play Heartbreak House